This is a list of players who appeared in at least one game with the early professional and semi-professional basketball team, the Philadelphia Sphas. Some of the names in this list are incomplete.

A 
 Anderson, first name unknown
 George Artus
 Atherholt, first name unknown

B 

 Oscar Baldwin  
 David "Davey" Banks
 Baraz, first name unknown
 Thomas "Tom" Barlow
 Bob Barnett
 Morris "Moe" Becker
 William "Billy" Beckett
 Edward "Ed" Beron
 Solomon "Solly" Bertman
 Edwin "Hughie" Black
 Meyer "Mike" Bloom
 Simon "Cy" Boardman
 Brophy, first name known
 Andy Brown
 Stanley "Stan" Brown
 Mark "Mockie" Bunin

C 
 Min Calhoun
 James "Soup" Campbell
 Gaza Chizmadia
 George Clift
 Saul Cohen
 Roger "Rody" Cooney

D 

 Davis, first name unknown
 Irving "Irv" Davis
 Cornelius "Neil" Deighan
 Richard "Rich" Deighan
 Joe Della Monica
 James "Jimmy" Dessen
 Disney, first name unknown
 Edwin "Eddie" Dolin
 "Jiggs" Downey
 Louis "Lou" Dubin

E 
 Emslie, first name unknown

F 

 George Feigenbaum
 Gilbert "Gil" Fitch
 Jerome "Jerry" Fleishman
 "Buck" Flemming
 Bernie Fliegel
 Harry Forman
 Louis "Lou" Forman
 Russell "Russ" Fossett
 Dave Fox
 L. James "Jim" Fox
 "Bunny" Freeman
 Mooney "Mort" Freemark

G 

 Walter "Walt" Gailey
 Daniel "Bud" Gaines
 George Garber
 Jack "Dutch" Garfinkel
 C. Gorham Getchell
 Schireli Geventer
 George Glasco
 Edward "Sonny" Gluck
 Emanuel "Menchy" Goldblatt
 Benjamen "Ben" Goldfaden
 Morris "Moe" Goldman
 Dave Gordon
 Gorman, first name unknown
 Joel "Shikey" Gotthofer
 Edward "Eddie" Gottlieb
 Leo Gottlieb
 Matthew "Matt" Goukas
 Greenspan, first name unknown
 Robert "Bob" Griebe
 Arthur "Art" Gurfein

H 
 Ed Hall
 Harris, first name unknown
 George Herlich
 John "Jack" Hewson
 Arthur "Art" Hillhouse
 Joseph "Joe" Hyde

K 

 Ralph Kaplowitz
 David "Cy" Kaselman
 Julius "Jules" Kasner
 Edward "Ted" Kearns
 Alfred "Al" Kellett
 Ed Kempner
 Harry Kirshner
 Louis "Red" Klotz
 Ralph "Babe" Klotz
 Harry Knorr
 Herman Knuppel
 William "Bill" Kobler
 Meyer "Moyer" Krabovitch
 Ray Kravitz

L 

 Louis "Inky" Lautman
 Isadore "Izzy" Leff
 Allen "Al" Lehr
 Charles Lester
 William "Bill" Levine
 Abraham Lewbart
 Harry Litwack
 Bob Lojewski
 Milton "Babe" Liman
 Eddie Lyons

M 

 Michael "Mickey" Maister
 Eddie Makransky
 Phil Markoff
 Marshall, first name unknown
 William "Bill" McCahan
 John "Red" McGaffney
 Daniel "Dan" McNichol
 Frank "Stretch" Meehan
 Solomon "Sol" Miehoff
 Edward "Ed" Miller
 David Mondros
 Pete Monska
 Samuel "Sam" Moorehead
 William "Chink" Morganstine
 Elmore Morgenthaler
 Charles "Charlie" Mosicant
 John "Johnny" Murphy

N 
 Charles "Charlie" Neuman
 George "Dutch" Newman
 Paul Nowak

O 
 Tom O'Connell
 Bernard "Bernie" Opper

P 

 Harry Passon
 Herman "Chickie" Passon
 Max Patkin
 Pearson, first name unknown
 Harry Platt
 Max "Mac" Posnak
 Louis "Lou" Possner
 Joseph "Joe" Povernick
 Prescott, first name unknown

R 

 Phil Rabin
 Howard "Howie" Rader
 Leonard "Len" Rader
 Moe Rappaport
 John "Inky" Reagan
 Irvin "Irv" Reichman
 Joseph "Beno" Resnick
 Henry "Harry" Riconda
 Jack Rocker
 Howard "Red" Rosan
 Alexander "Petey" Rosenberg
 Irwin "Irv" Rothenberg
 Generoso "Jerry" Rullo
 Rutt, first name unknown

S 

 Oscar "Ossie" Schectman
 Alfred "Al" Scheider
 Louis "Lou" Schneiderman
 John Schrey
 Solomon "Butch" Schwartz
 George Senesky
 Louis "Reds" Sherr
 C. Arthur "Art" Shires
 Morris "Mendy" Snyder
 Soltaire, first name unknown
 Staberg, first name unknown
 Frank Stanczak
 Charles "Charlie" Swartz

T 
 Aaron Tanitsky
 Charles Tettemer
 David "Hank" Thomas
 David "Dave" Tobey
 Irving "Irv" Torgoff
 Edward "Ed" Trubin

V 
 Wylys "Bill" Van Osten

W 

 Paul Wallace
 Watman, first name unknown
 Leonard "Len" Weiner
 Abraham "Butch" Weintraub
 Frederick "Fritz" Weller
 Jack "Yock" Welsh
 Fred "Fritz" Wesslock
 "Doc" White
 Robert "Albie" Wiener
 Williams, first name unknown
 Wilson, first name unknown
 Lou Wisner
 George "Red" Wolfe

Y 
 D. Young

Z 
 Bill Zeiss
 Nathan "Zibby" Zibelman
 William "Bill Zubic"

References 

Lists of basketball players in the United States